In Living Color the sixth volume of the Television's Greatest Hits series of compilation albums by TVT Records. The album catalog was later acquired by The Bicycle Music Company. In September 2011, Los Angeles-based Oglio Records announced they were releasing the  Television's Greatest Hits song catalog after entering into an arrangement The Bicycle Music Company. A series of 9 initial "6-packs" including some of the songs from the album has been announced for 2011.

Track listing 
A1 Stingray
A2 Thunderbirds
A3 Gigantor
A4 Klondike Kat
A5 The Go-Go Gophers
A6 The World of Commander McBragg
A7 Secret Squirrel
A8 The Atom Ant Show
A9 Wacky Races
A10 Hong Kong Phooey
A11 Super Chicken
A12 Tom Slick Racer
A13 H.R. Pufnstuf
A14 Land of the Lost
A15 Sigmund and the Sea Monsters
A16 Banana Splits ("The Tra La La Song" (AKA "One Banana, Two Banana"))
B1 Chico and the Man
B2 Please Don't Eat the Daisies
B3 The Ghost & Mrs. Muir
B4 Nanny and the Professor
B5 Here Come the Brides ("Seattle")
B6 The Flying Nun ("Who Needs Wings To Fly")
B7 Family Affair
B8 The Dating Game
B9 The Newlywed Game
B10 Let's Make a Deal
B11 All My Children
B12 General Hospital ("Autumn Breeze")
B13 Peyton Place ("Wonderful Season of Love")
B14 Mary Hartman, Mary Hartman ("Premiere Occasion (You Have Never Been In Love)")
C1 Gentle Ben
C2 Skippy the Bush Kangaroo
C3 The Life and Times of Grizzly Adams ("Maybe")
C4 The High Chaparral
C5 The Big Valley
C6 Cimarron Strip
C7 Laredo
C8 The Men From Shiloh
C9 It Takes a Thief
C10 The Magician
C11 Switch
C12 Felony Squad
C13 Police Woman
C14 The Men
C15 Cannon
C16 Judd, for the Defense
C17 Emergency!
D1 Police Story
D2 The Six Million Dollar Man
D3 The Bionic Woman
D4 The Girl from U.N.C.L.E.
D5 Night Gallery
D6 Kolchak: The Night Stalker
D7 The Invaders
D8 Land of the Giants
D9 Lost In Space
D10 Olympic Fanfare
D11 Masterpiece Theatre
D12 Hullabaloo
D13 Where the Action Is ("Action")
D14 Happening '68
D15 This Is Tom Jones ("It's Not Unusual")
D16 Rowan & Martin's Laugh-In ("Inquisitive Tango")
D17 The Dean Martin Show ("Everybody Loves Somebody")
D18 The Carol Burnett Show ("Carol's Theme")

References

External links
Television's Greatest Hits at Oglio Records

1996 compilation albums
TVT Records compilation albums
Television's Greatest Hits albums